HQM Sachsenring GmbH is a Zwickau-based company that supplies chassis and body parts to the automotive industry. The company was named after the Sachsenring race track. Founded as VEB Sachsenring after the end of World War II, Sachsenring was one of the few manufacturers of vehicles in East Germany, its best known product being the Trabant, produced between 1957 and 1991. Following the reunification of Germany in 1990, Sachsenring transitioned from a government-owned company under a centrally-planned economy to a private corporation in a free market economy.

After three years in bankruptcy, Sachsenring AG  was purchased in February, 2006 by Härterei und Qualitätsmanagement GmbH (HQM) of Leipzig. Formerly the dominant major automaker in East Germany, Sachsenring has since departed from making motor vehicles. Today, it supplies, among other things, the Volkswagen factory with parts for the Golf and Passat models.

Models

Supermini 
 AWZ P70 Zwickau (1955–1959)
 Trabant P50 (1957–1962)
 Trabant 600 (1962–1965)
 Trabant 601 (1964–1990)
 Trabant 1.1 (1990–1991)
 Sachsenring UNI 1 (prototype, 1996)

Luxury vehicle 
 Sachsenring P240 (1954–1959)
 Sachsenring P240 Repräsentant (1969)

Trucks 
 IFA H3A (1957–1958)
 IFA S4000 (1959–1960)

Cultural impact 

The German bitpop pioneers Welle:Erdball have been using a rotated version of the Sachsenring emblem as their band logo since 1996.

Gallery

References

External links 

HQM official site (German)
Official Site of August Horch Museum Zwickau
 UK-based official Wartburg, Trabant and IFA owners' club

Automotive companies of Germany
Car manufacturers of Germany
Car manufacturers of East Germany
Zwickau
 
1957 establishments in East Germany
Vehicle manufacturing companies established in 1957
2006 mergers and acquisitions